Red Lion, Red Lions, Red Lyon, Red Lion Inn and variations, may refer to:

Arts and entertainment
 Red Lion (film), a 1969 Japanese film
 Red Lion (theatre), an Elizabethan playhouse in London
 The Red Lion, a 1946 novel by Mária Szepes
 The Red Lion, a 2015 play by Patrick Marber
 Red Lion, a robot vehicle from the animated television series Voltron

Businesses and organisations 
 Red Lion (St. Paul's Churchyard) (aka Red Lyon), a historical bookseller in London
 Red Lion Area School District, York County, Pennsylvania, U.S.
 Red Lion Broadcasting, the subject of Red Lion Broadcasting Co. v. FCC, a U.S. Supreme Court decision
 Red Lion Hotel, Cromer, England
 Red Lion Hotels Corporation, an American company 
Red Lion Hotels
 Red Lion and Sun Society, the former name of the Red Crescent in Iran
 Red Lions (political party), a defunct political party in Belgium
 Red Lion Inn (Brooklyn), New York, U.S.
 Red Lion Inn (Stockbridge, Massachusetts), U.S.

Pubs 
 Red Lion, a popular pub name
 Red Lion, Ampney St Peter, Gloucestershire, England
 Red Lion, Handsworth, Birmingham, England
 Red Lion, Hillingdon, London, England
 Red Lion, Oxford, England
 Red Lion, Snargate, Kent, England
 Red Lion, Duke of York Street, St James's, London, England
 Red Lion, Westminster, London, England
 Red Lion, Great Windmill Street, London, England
 Red Lion Inn, Philadelphia, U.S.
 Red Lion Inn, Shoreham-by-Sea, West Sussex, England
 Red Lion Inn, Southampton
 Old Red Lion, Holborn, London, England
 Red Lion, Belfast, Northern Ireland, subject of the 1971 Red Lion Pub bombing
 The Red Lion, Chipping Barnet, London, England
 The Red Lion, Hatfield, Hertfordshire, England
 The Red Lion, York, Yorkshire, England

Places

United States
 Red Lion Airport, Burlington County, New Jersey
 Red Lion, Delaware
 Red Lion Creek, Delaware
 Red Lion Hundred, New Castle County, Delaware
Red Lion Inn (Stockbridge, Massachusetts)
 Red Lion, Burlington County, New Jersey
 Red Lion, Middlesex County, New Jersey
 Red Lion, Ohio
 Red Lion, York County, Pennsylvania
Red Lion Borough Historic District

Elsewhere
 Red Lion, Victoria, Australia
 Red Lion Hill, Powys, Wales
 FOB Red Lion, a former U.S. Army Forward Operating Base in Camp Ashraf, Iraq

Sport 
Red Lions (field hockey), the Belgian national field hockey team 
Red Lions FC (Liberia), a football club
Red Lions FC (Malawi), a football club
San Beda Red Lions, an American basketball team

Other uses
 Red Lions, the Singapore Armed Forces Parachute Team
 Den Røde Løve (Danish ship)

See also

Flag of Luxembourg
Royal Standard of the United Kingdom
Royal Banner of Scotland
Lion (heraldry)
Red lionfish